The 2011–12 season of the Israeli Futsal League was the 6th season of top-tier futsal under the Israel Football Association and 12th overall. The regular season started on 26 December 2011 and was concluded on 24 March 2012. The championship playoffs began on 27 March 2012 with quarter-finals series and concluded with the championship final, played on 10 April.

ASA Ben-Gurion University were the defending champions, but lost the title by losing to Maccabi Nahlat Itzhak Tel Aviv in the playoff final.

Format changes
With 8 clubs registered to play in the league, the clubs played each other in a double round-robin tournament, with all matches played in Amal School Hall in Hadera (home of basketball team Maccabi Hadera). At the end of the regular season, all teams qualified to the playoffs, with seeding determined by their regular season placing.

Regular season table

Playoffs

Championship bracket

5th to 8th place

External links
Israeli Futsal League 2011-2012 IFA

References

Israeli Futsal League
Futsal
Israel